Fernando Campos Quiroz  (15 October 1923 – 14 September 2004) was a Chilean football midfielder who played for Chile in the 1950 FIFA World Cup. He also played for Colo-Colo, a Chilean football club.

References

External links

1921 births
2004 deaths
Chilean footballers
Chile international footballers
Colo-Colo footballers
1950 FIFA World Cup players
Association football midfielders